The following is a list of players, both past and current, who appeared in at least one game for the Kia/Mahindra/Columbian/Terrafirma PBA franchise. Statistics are accurate as of the 2023 PBA Governors' Cup.

Players

|-
| align=left| || align=left| || G/F || align=left| || 1 ||  || 27 || 263 || 75 || 11 || 5 || 
|-
| align=left| || align=left| || F || align=left| || 2 || – || 22 || 541 || 213 || 155 || 13 || 
|-
| align=left| || align=left| || G/F || align=left| || 3 || – || 39 || 352 || 105 || 66 || 26 || 
|-
| align=left| || align=left| || F || align=left| || 1 ||  || 12 || 100 || 39 || 29 || 1 || 
|-
| bgcolor="#CFECEC" align=left|^ || align=left| || G || align=left| || 2 || –present || 22 || 292 || 80 || 36 || 30 || 
|-
| align=left| || align=left| || F || align=left| || 1 ||  || 6 || 64 || 5 || 15 || 4 || |
|-
| bgcolor="#FFCC00" align=left|+ || align=left| || F || align=left| || 1 ||  || 11 || 486 || 314 || 200 || 35 || 
|-
| align=left| || align=left| || F || align=left| || 2 || – || 43 || 520 || 93 || 112 || 30 ||
|-
| align=left| || align=left| || F || align=left| || 1 ||  || 7 || 95 || 41 || 20 || 4 ||
|-
| align=left| || align=left| || G || align=left| || 1 ||  || 11 || 185 || 68 || 41 || 12 ||
|-
| align=left| || align=left| || G || align=left| || 1 ||  || 16 || 232 || 89 || 21 || 14 ||
|-
| align=left| || align=left| || G || align=left| || 2 || – || 44 || 594 || 186 || 68 || 63 ||
|-
| align=left| || align=left| || F/C || align=left| || 3 || – || 35 || 287 || 43 || 46 || 6 ||
|-
| align=left| || align=left| || C || align=left| || 2 || – || 48 || 608 || 83 || 170 || 6 ||
|-
| align=left| || align=left| || G || align=left| || 1 ||  || 1 || 3 || 0 || 1 || 0 ||
|-
| bgcolor="#FFCC00" align=left|+ || align=left| || C || align=left| || 1 ||  || 4 || 161 || 108 || 60 || 12 ||
|-
| align=left| || align=left| || F || align=left nowrap| || 1 ||  || 1 || 4 || 0 || 0 || 0 ||
|-
| bgcolor="#CFECEC" align=left|^ || align=left| || G || align=left| || 3 || –present || 26 || 234 || 94 || 19 || 34 ||
|-
| align=left| || align=left| || G || align=left| || 1 ||  || 29 || 530 || 143 || 74 || 65 ||
|-
| align=left| || align=left| || F/C || align=left| || 1 ||  || 11 || 118 || 27 || 19 || 2 ||
|-
| bgcolor="#CFECEC" align=left|^ || align=left| || G || align=left| || 2 || –present || 24 || 621 || 208 || 97 || 128 || 
|-
| align=left| || align=left| || F || align=left| || 2 || – || 34 || 212 || 84 || 25 || 10 ||
|-
| bgcolor="#CFECEC" align=left|^ || align=left| || F || align=left| || 5 || –present || 116 || 2,362 || 569 || 448 || 118 ||
|-
| bgcolor="#CFECEC" align=left|^ || align=left| || G || align=left| || 4 || –present || 90 || 1,625 || 455 || 197 || 234 ||
|-
| bgcolor="#CFECEC" align=left|^ || align=left| || F || align=left| || 6 || –present || 130 || 2,131 || 1,007 || 516 || 104 ||
|-
| align=left| || align=left| || F || align=left| || 1 ||  || 32 || 809 || 373 || 122 || 31 ||
|-
| align=left| || align=left| || F/C || align=left| || 2 || –  || 20 || 180 || 43 || 41 || 5 ||
|-
| align=left| || align=left| || F || align=left| || 1 ||  || 14 || 198 || 66 || 18 || 11 ||
|-
| align=left| || align=left| || G || align=left| || 5 || – || 113 || 1,918 || 785 || 212 || 191 ||
|-
| align=left| || align=left| || F || align=left| || 1 ||  || 17 || 451 || 233 || 82 || 27 ||
|-
| bgcolor="#FFCC00" align=left|+ || align=left| || G || align=left| || 1 ||  || 11 || 318 || 140 || 41 || 13 || 
|-
| align=left| || align=left| || F || align=left| || 3 || – || 73 || 1,426 || 600 || 397 || 62 ||
|-
| bgcolor="#FFCC00" align=left|+ || align=left| || F || align=left| || 1 ||  || 7 || 229 || 189 || 59 || 20 ||
|-
| align=left| || align=left| || G/F || align=left| || 1 ||  || 5 || 103 || 30 || 13 || 0 ||
|-
| bgcolor="#CFECEC" align=left|^ || align=left| || G || align=left| || 2 || –present || 19 || 353 || 108 || 37 || 43 ||
|-
| align=left| || align=left| || G || align=left| || 1 ||  || 8 || 97 || 52 || 10 || 2 ||
|-
| align=left| || align=left| || G/F || align=left| || 1 ||  || 4 || 23 || 2 || 3 || 0 ||
|-
| align=left| || align=left| || G || align=left| || 2 || – || 49 || 1,265 || 456 || 148 || 99 ||
|-
| align=left| || align=left| || F || align=left| || 2 ||  || 36 || 513 || 154 || 105 || 23 ||
|-
| align=left| || align=left| || G || align=left| || 2 || – || 35 || 575 || 194 || 44 || 31 ||
|-
| align=left| || align=left| || G || align=left| || 2 || – || 34 || 447 || 116 || 69 || 48 ||
|-
| bgcolor="#CFECEC" align=left|^ || align=left| || G/F || align=left| || 1 || –present || 7 || 39 || 0 || 8 || 1 ||
|-
| align=left| || align=left| || F || align=left| || 1 ||  || 11 || 184 || 73 || 41 || 4 ||
|-
| align=left| || align=left| || F/C || align=left| || 3 || – || 57 || 781 || 267 || 165 || 27 ||
|-
| align=left| || align=left| || C || align=left| || 2 || – || 37 || 335 || 82 || 80 || 3 ||
|-
| bgcolor="#CFECEC" align=left|^ || align=left| || F || align=left| || 1 || –present || 6 || 127 || 28 || 8 || 3 ||
|-
| bgcolor="#FFCC00" align=left|+ || align=left| || C || align=left| || 1 ||  || 8 || 330 || 233 || 153 || 28 ||
|-
| align=left| || align=left| || F/C || align=left| || 1 ||  || 7 || 37 || 11 || 7 || 3 ||
|-
| bgcolor="#CFECEC" align=left|^ || align=left| || C || align=left| || 4 || –present || 65 || 923 || 307 || 250 || 39 ||
|-
| align=left| || align=left| || F/C || align=left| || 2 || – || 25 || 209 || 97 || 57 || 6 ||
|-
| align=left| || align=left| || G/F || align=left| || 3 || – || 32 || 372 || 116 || 39 || 10 ||
|-
| align=left| || align=left| || G/F || align=left| || 1 ||  || 15 || 387 || 81 || 56 || 47 ||
|-
| bgcolor="#FFCC00" align=left|+ || align=left| || F/C || align=left| || 1 ||  || 11 || 440 || 226 || 131 || 26 ||
|-
| bgcolor="#CFECEC" align=left|^ || align=left| || F/C || align=left| || 2 || –present || 8 || 90 || 37 || 22 || 1 ||
|-
| bgcolor="#CFECEC" align=left|^ || align=left| || G/F || align=left| || 1 || –present || 33 || 539 || 197 || 97 || 38 ||
|-
| bgcolor="#CFECEC" align=left|^ || align=left| || F || align=left| || 1 || –present || 10 || 29 || 2 || 1 || 2 ||
|-
| align=left| || align=left| || G/F || align=left| || 1 ||  || 9 || 94 || 25 || 10 || 3 ||
|-
| align=left| || align=left| || F/C || align=left| || 1 ||  || 34 || 530 || 174 || 148 || 16 ||
|-
| bgcolor="#FFCC00" align=left|+ || align=left| || F/C || align=left| || 1 ||  || 11 || 429 || 311 || 139 || 35 ||
|-
| align=left| || align=left| || G || align=left| || 1 ||  || 15 || 202 || 45 || 31 || 9 ||
|-
| align=left| || align=left| || F || align=left| || 1 ||  || 16 || 192 || 32 || 29 || 10 ||
|-
| align=left| || align=left| || F || align=left| || 3 || – || 37 || 369 || 143 || 87 || 11 ||
|-
| align=left| || align=left| || F || align=left| || 1 ||  || 7 || 79 || 30 || 8 || 3 ||
|-
| align=left| || align=left| || G || align=left| || 1 ||  || 12 || 148 || 28 || 16 || 17 ||
|-
| bgcolor="#FFCC00" align=left|+ || align=left| || G || align=left| || 1 ||  || 4 || 167 || 136 || 32 || 26 ||
|-
| align=left| || align=left| || F || align=left| || 4 || – || 82 || 1,751 || 603 || 211 || 83 ||
|-
| align=left| || align=left| || G || align=left| || 2 || – || 27 || 802 || 391 || 138 || 77 ||
|-
| align=left| || align=left| || C || align=left| || 1 ||  || 10 || 104 || 26 || 26 || 3 ||
|-
| align=left| || align=left| || G || align=left| || 1 ||  || 19 || 277 || 115 || 25 || 34 ||
|-
| align=left| || align=left| || F || align=left| || 1 ||  || 8 || 75 || 18 || 13 || 4 ||
|-
| align=left| || align=left| || G || align=left| || 1 ||  || 7 || 133 || 55 || 17 || 17 ||
|-
| align=left| || align=left| || G/F || align=left| || 1 ||  || 18 || 572 || 280 || 115 || 78 ||
|-
| align=left| || align=left| || G || align=left| || 1 ||  || 2 || 36 || 0 || 5 || 6 ||
|-
| align=left| || align=left| || G || align=left| || 4 || – || 83 || 2,664 || 1,110 || 374 || 348 ||
|-
| align=left| || align=left| || G || align=left| || 1 ||  || 3 || 30 || 7 || 4 || 2 ||
|-
| bgcolor="#CFECEC" align=left|^ || align=left| || G/F || align=left| || 1 || –present || 29 || 332 || 117 || 44 || 13 ||
|-
| align=left| || align=left| || G/F || align=left| || 2 || – || 31 || 867 || 382 || 113 || 74 ||
|-
| bgcolor="#FFCC00" align=left|+ || align=left| || C || align=left| || 1 ||  || 11 || 471 || 194 || 167 || 13 ||
|-
| align=left| || align=left| || G/F || align=left| || 1 ||  || 17 || 180 || 43 || 26 || 19 ||
|-
| align=left| || align=left| || G/F || align=left| || 1 ||  || 10 || 177 || 57 || 25 || 4 ||
|-
| align=left| || align=left| || G || align=left| || 3 || – || 10 || 59 || 13 || 5 || 2 ||
|-
| align=left| || align=left| || G || align=left| || 1 ||  || 9 || 143 || 36 || 27 || 8 ||
|-
| align=left| || align=left| || G || align=left| || 3 || – || 39 || 641 || 248 || 72 || 52 ||
|-
| align=left| || align=left| || F/C || align=left| || 1 ||  || 2 || 21 || 5 || 5 || 0 ||
|-
| align=left| || align=left| || G || align=left|WMSU || 1 ||  || 5 || 15 || 4 || 2 || 2 ||
|-
| align=left| || align=left| || F/C || align=left| || 3 || –2021–2022 || 53 || 860 || 235 || 131 || 19 ||
|-
| align=left| || align=left| || G || align=left| || 2 || – || 44 || 1,656 || 954 || 319 || 158 ||
|-
| align=left| || align=left| || G || align=left| || 1 ||  || 29 || 469 || 96 || 77 || 72 ||
|-
| align=left| || align=left| || G || align=left| || 1 ||  || 11 || 149 || 42 || 16 || 15 ||
|-
| bgcolor="#FFCC00" align=left|+ || align=left| || C || align=left| || 2 ||  || 17 || 721 || 522 || 274 || 38 ||
|-
| bgcolor="#CFECEC" align=left|^ || align=left| || F || align=left| || 4 || –present || 98 || 2,435 || 993 || 490 || 100 ||
|-
| bgcolor="#FFCC00" align=left|+ || align=left| || C || align=left| Puerto Rico || 1 ||  || 11 || 476 || 395 || 233 || 33 ||
|-
| align=left| || align=left| || C || align=left| || 1 ||  || 10 || 138 || 27 || 29 || 3 ||
|-
| align=left| || align=left| || G || align=left| || 3 || – || 93 || 2,453 || 842 || 346 || 373 ||
|-
| align=left| || align=left| || F/C || align=left| || 2 || – || 36 || 591 || 175 || 137 || 29 ||
|-
| align=left| || align=left| || F || align=left| || 1 ||  || 5 || 74 || 9 || 17 || 2 ||
|-
| align=left| || align=left| || F || align=left| || 1 ||  || 31 || 385 || 109 || 61 || 15 ||
|-
| align=left| || align=left| || G/F || align=left| || 1 ||  || 6 || 43 || 7 || 8 || 1 ||
|-
| align=left| || align=left| || G || align=left| || 1 ||  || 25 || 275 || 54 || 33 || 28 ||
|-
| align=left| || align=left| || C || align=left| || 1 ||  || 1 || 2|| 0 || 1 || 0 ||
|-
| align=left| || align=left| || G || align=left| || 1 ||  || 6 || 23 || 4 || 2 || 3 ||
|-
| align=left| || align=left| || G/F || align=left| || 1 ||  || 13 || 303 || 138 || 41 || 18 ||
|-
| align=left| || align=left| || G || align=left| || 1 ||  || 16 || 108 || 41 || 17 || 5 ||
|-
| align=left| || align=left| || F/C || align=left| || 1 ||  || 26 || 363 || 120 || 94 || 11 ||
|-
| bgcolor="#CFECEC" align=left|^ || align=left| || G || align=left| || 4 || –present || 74 || 2,302 || 1,169 || 226 || 210 ||
|-
| align=left| || align=left| || G/F || align=left| || 1 ||  || 30 || 526 || 200 || 96 || 34 ||
|-
| align=left| || align=left| || G || align=left| || 1 ||  || 8 || 48 || 6 || 5 || 1 ||
|-
| align=left| || align=left| || G || align=left| || 3 || – || 38 || 321 || 109 || 47 || 10 ||
|-
| bgcolor="#FFCC00" align=left|+ || align=left| || F || align=left|  || 2 || – || 17 || 664 || 438 || 244 || 25 ||
|-
| bgcolor="#FFCC00" align=left|+ || align=left| || G || align=left|  || 1 ||  || 11 || 479 || 378 || 102 || 41 ||
|-
| bgcolor="#FFCC00" align=left|+ || align=left| || G/F || align=left|  || 1 ||  || 11 || 457 || 249 || 131 || 63 ||
|-
| bgcolor="#FFCC00" align=left|+ || align=left| || F || align=left|  || 1 ||  || 7 || 289 || 137 || 107 || 17 ||
|-
| align=left| || align=left| || F || align=left| || 4 || – || 100 || 1,571 || 593 || 423 || 57 ||
|-
| bgcolor="#FFCC00" align=left| || align=left| || G || align=left|IAU || 1 ||  || 5 || 98 || 33 || 6 || 7 ||
|}

References 

   
Philippine Basketball Association all-time rosters